George Moellring (November 14, 1878 – May 31, 1935) was a justice of the North Dakota Supreme Court from December 1, 1933 to the end of 1934.

References

Justices of the North Dakota Supreme Court
1878 births
1935 deaths